The 2017 World Rugby Pacific Nations Cup was the twelfth edition of the Pacific Nations Cup annual international rugby union tournament. The 2017 title was contested solely by the Pacific nations of Fiji, Samoa and Tonga.

Teams competing in previous years, Canada, Japan and the United States were not scheduled to participate in the tournament for 2017 or 2016 due to the 2019 Rugby World Cup qualifying format. The top two teams on aggregate across the 2016 and 2017 Pacific Nations Cups for Japan 2019, with the team finishing third scheduled to enter the repechage for qualification.

Having not hosted a test match since playing Fiji in June 2009, Tonga was given the go-ahead to host a test match with World Rugby's approval of the revamped Teufaiva Sport Stadium.

Fiji retained their title to win for the third consecutive year.

Table

Fixtures
The full match schedule was announced on 23 March 2017.

Round 1

Notes:
 This was Tonga's first home game since they played Fiji in 2009.
 This was Tonga's first win over Samoa since they won 29–19 in 2011.
 Siegfried Fisiihoi and Atieli Pakalani (both Tonga) and Auvasa Faleali’i, Jordan Lay, Henry Taefu and Masalosalo Tutaia (all Samoa) made their international debuts.
 David Lemi (Samoa) earned his 50th test cap.

Round 2

Notes:
 Sione Tau (Tonga) made his international debut.
 With this Result Fiji guaranteed qualification for the Rugby World Cup 2019 as Oceana 1.

Round 3

Notes:
 James Lay (Samoa) and Frank Lomani (Fiji) made their international debuts.
 This was Fiji's first win in Samoa since their 17–16 win in 2002.

Squads

Note: Number of caps and players' ages are indicated as of 1 July 2017 – the tournament's opening day, pre first tournament match.

Fiji
On 9 May, John McKee named an extended squad ahead of Fiji's 2017 June tests against Australia, Italy and Scotland and their Rugby Pacific Nations Cup / 2019 RWC Oceania qualification campaign in July.

Samoa
On 29 May, Alama Ieremia named a 35-man squad ahead of Samoa's 2017 June tests against New Zealand and Wales and their Pacific Nations Cup / 2019 RWC Oceania qualification campaign in July.

Tonga
On 9 June, Tonga named a 35-man extended squad for their 2017 June test against Wales and their Pacific Nations Cup / 2019 RWC Oceania qualification campaign in July.

References
 

2017
2017 rugby union tournaments for national teams
2017 in Oceanian rugby union
2017 in Samoan rugby union
2017 in Tongan rugby union
2017 in Fijian rugby union